Zinda Bhaag is a 2013 Pakistani Punjabi-language drama film co-directed by Meenu Gaur and Farjad Nabi, and produced by Mazhar Zaidi. The film focuses on the issue of illegal migration. The film had a premiere show on 19 September 2013 and a wide release on 20 September. The film was selected as the Pakistani entry for the Best Foreign Language Film at the 86th Academy Awards, the first in over 50 years. The film was made as part of a project on masculinity titled Let's Talk Men, affiliated with United Nations agencies for the prevention of gender-based violence.

Plot
Zinda Bhaag unravels the theme of illegal immigration highlighting the issue and the epicentre of this trend within Punjab. The story of Zinda Bhaag unravels the theme of illegal immigration, called 'dunky'. This involves inhuman and dangerous methods of crossing borders into foreign lands. It is a film about three young men trying to escape the reality of their everyday lives and succeeding in ways they had least expected. In a nondescript neighbourhood of Lahore within Punjab, three friends are desperate to get onto the fast track to success. Khaldi, Taambi, and Chitta, all in their early twenties, believe that the only way out is to the West. The journey that unfolds through the story of this film gives us an insight into what constitutes the everyday lives of many young men and women in Pakistan – a sense of entitlement that cannot be fulfilled, desperation to somehow prove themselves in the face of all legitimate doors being locked, and an ennui from which they feel there is no getaway.

Cast

 Zain Afzal as Khoota
Naseeruddin Shah as Puhlwan
Amna Ilyas as Rubina
 Khurram Patras as Khaldi
 Salman Ahmad Khan as Chitta
Zohaib Asghar as Taambi
 Ibrahim Rauf Khawaja as himself
Samiya Mumtaz (Cameo)
Rahat Fateh Ali Khan as himself
Naeema Butt

Awards
The film won four awards at the International South Asian Film Festival in Canada. The film won a 'Special Jury Award' at the Jaipur International Film Festival. The film also received five awards including Best Film (Jury) at the recently concluded ARY Film Awards held under the aegis of the Pakistani TV channel network, ARY Digital Network. The film also won 'Best Film', 'Best Director' (Meenu & Farjad) and 'Best Actor' (Khurram Patras) in Pakistan's prestigious 'Lux Style Awards' and the 'Student Jury Award' at Festival du Film d'Asie du Sud Transgressif (FFAST) in Paris.

Soundtrack

Track listing
The original soundtrack (OST) of the film is sung by Rahat Fateh Ali Khan. The film's music features the voices of Abrarul Haq, Arif Lohar, and Saleema Jawwad. Lohar and Jawwad have sung a song on love and death while Bagga has contributed his vocals to two tracks, an upbeat dance-bhangra number and a romantic ballad.

Release
The first look of Zinda Bhaag's trailer was unveiled on 18 June 2013. This film was earlier set to release on 6 September. Due to a backlog of unreleased films, the release of 'Zinda Bhaag' was postponed. It released on 20 September 2013. 'Zinda Bhaag' had been released in 10 states in the US as well on 18 October 2013.
Zinda Bhaag screened during the seventh edition of the National Film Development Corporation (NFDC) initiative Film Bazaar, (20 November 2013) in Goa. The film also released in India. The film arrived at Abu Dhabi Film Festival (24 October – 2 November 2013) and consequently was theatrically released in the UAE. It was subsequently released on Netflix in 2015.

Accolades
The film received a total of 19-nominations at the first ARY Film Awards tying with Main Hoon Shahid Afridi.

See also
 List of submissions to the 86th Academy Awards for Best Foreign Language Film
 List of Pakistani submissions for the Academy Award for Best Foreign Language Film

References

Further reading

External links 
 
 

2013 films
Punjabi-language Pakistani films
2010s Punjabi-language films
Films scored by Sahir Ali Bagga